Mike Burkhead is a former American football quarterback who played one season with the Miami Hooters of the Arena Football League. He played college football at the University of Richmond.

References

External links
Just Sports Stats

Living people
Year of birth missing (living people)
American football quarterbacks
Richmond Spiders football players
Miami Hooters players